Charlotte, Princess Royal (Charlotte Augusta Matilda; 29 September 1766 – 5 October 1828), was Queen of Württemberg as the wife of King Frederick I. She was the eldest daughter and fourth child of George III, King of the United Kingdom and his wife, Charlotte of Mecklenburg-Strelitz.

Early life

Princess Charlotte was born on 29 September 1766 at Buckingham House, London, to British monarch, King George III and Charlotte of Mecklenburg-Strelitz. She was christened on 27 October 1766 at St James's Palace by the Archbishop of Canterbury, Thomas Secker, and her godparents were her paternal aunts Caroline Matilda and Louisa and Caroline Matilda's husband King Christian VII of Denmark. The Duke of Portland, Lord Chamberlain, and the Dowager Countess of Effingham, stood proxy for the King and Queen of Denmark.

Charlotte was officially designated as Princess Royal on 22 June 1789. After the birth of three sons in a row, her parents were delighted to have a Princess in the nursery. Like all of her siblings, Charlotte was inoculated, in her case, in December 1768 along with her brother William. As the eldest daughter of the monarch, Charlotte was assumed to be destined for an important marriage on the continent, and her education was considered to be of the utmost importance, beginning when she was only eighteen months old. Since French was the official language in every European court, the little Princess was given a Frenchwoman to be her tutor, in order that she should have no accent. Her memory was another of her early subjects. She was taught to recite little verses and stories, and as a result had an almost uncanny ability to recall detail for the rest of her life. Her early childhood, however, was not  only focused on scholarly pursuits. When she was almost three years old, she took part in her first tableau dressed like Columbine, where she danced with her seven-year-old brother George, Prince of Wales. She was not a naturally musical child and later abhorred such displays of children, declaring that they made children vain and self-important. This did not stop her parents from continuing to show her off. In late 1769, she and the Prince of Wales were once again displayed, this time to the public in a "junior drawing room" in St James's Palace. Charlotte was dressed in a Roman toga and lay on a sofa. Though this type of thing was common in German courts, it was considered vulgar in England, where in reaction a London mob drove a hearse into the Palace courtyard. Afterwards, the Prince of Wales told Lady Mary Coke that the whole event had made Charlotte "terribly tired". Wisely, the King and Queen decided to never repeat the experience.

Though she was the eldest daughter, Charlotte was constantly compared to her sister Augusta Sophia, only two years younger than she. When Augusta was a month old, Lady Mary Coke called her "the most beautiful baby I have ever seen" while Charlotte was "very plain". Passing judgement once again three years later, Charlotte was now "the most sensible agreeable child I ever saw, but in my opinion far from pretty" while Augusta was still "rather pretty". Although the Princess Royal was never as beautiful as her younger sister, she did not share in Augusta's primary flaw: painful shyness. Charlotte also had a stammer that her attendant Mary Dacres tried to help her young charge manage. In 1770, the cluster of the three eldest princesses was completed with the birth of Princess Elizabeth, the seventh child. For the time being the family remained comparatively small (there were fifteen royal children in all), and Charlotte was fortunate in having parents who preferred spending time with their numerous children to spending all their time at court and took her education seriously. However, given the frequency with which children were being produced and the troubles that plagued George III's reign, Charlotte's childhood was not as utopian as her parents planned it to be.

Like her siblings, the Princess Royal was educated by tutors and spent most her childhood at Buckingham House, Kew Palace, and Windsor Castle, where her wet nurse was Frances, wife of James Muttlebury.

Marriage
On 18 May 1797, the Princess Royal was married at the Chapel Royal, St James's Palace, London, to Frederick, Hereditary Prince of Württemberg, the eldest son and heir apparent of Frederick II Eugene, Duke of Württemberg and his wife, Margravine Sophia Dorothea of Brandenburg-Schwedt.

The younger Frederick succeeded his father as the reigning Duke of Württemberg on 22 December 1797. Duke Frederick II had two sons and two daughters by his first marriage to the late Princess Augusta (3 December 1764 – 27 September 1788), the daughter of Duke Karl II of Brunswick-Wolfenbüttel and Princess Augusta of Great Britain (the elder sister of George III) and thus Charlotte's first cousin; Princess Augusta was also the elder sister of Caroline of Brunswick, the estranged wife of the future George IV (then Prince of Wales). The marriage between Duke Frederick and the Princess Royal produced one child: a stillborn daughter on 27 April 1798.

Württemberg

In 1800, the French army occupied Württemberg and the Duke and Duchess fled to Vienna. The following year, Duke Frederick concluded a private treaty that ceded Montbéliard to France and brought him Ellwangen in exchange two years later. He assumed the title Elector of Württemberg on 25 February 1803. In exchange for providing France with a large auxiliary force, Napoleon recognized the Elector as King of Württemberg on 26 December 1805. Electress Charlotte became queen when her husband formally ascended the throne on 1 January 1806 and was crowned as such on the same day at Stuttgart, Germany.

Württemberg seceded from the Holy Roman Empire and joined Napoleon's  Confederation of the Rhine. However, the newly elevated king's alliance with France technically made him the enemy of his father-in-law, George III. George III, incensed by his son-in-law's assumption of the title and his role as one of Napoleon's most devoted vassals, accordingly refused to address his daughter as "Queen of Württemberg" in correspondence. In 1813, King Frederick changed sides and went over to the Allies, where his status as the brother-in-law of the Prince Regent (later George IV) helped his standing. After the fall of Napoleon, he attended the Congress of Vienna and was confirmed as king. He died in October 1816.

Dowager Queen
The Dowager Queen of Württemberg continued to live at the Ludwigsburg Palace, near Stuttgart, and received visits from her younger siblings, the Duke of Kent, the Duke of Sussex, the Duke of Cambridge, the Landgravine of Hesse-Homburg, and Princess Augusta Sophia. She was a godmother (by proxy) at the christening of her niece, Princess Victoria of Kent (the future Queen Victoria), in 1819.

In 1827, Charlotte would return to Britain for the first time since her wedding in 1797. By that time, the sixty years old princess was very heavy and wanted to have surgery for dropsy in England. Steam propulsion had just been introduced on the Rhine, and ensured that the voyage back home would be convenient. On 31 May she embarked on the new steamboat Friedrich Wilhelm. After descending the Rhine the steamboat arrived at Bath on the Western Scheldt. Due to her weight, Charlotte had to be lifted aboard Royal Sovereign on a chair that was hoisted. Due to bad weather, Royal Sovereign then had to leave Bath, and anchor near Vlissingen. On 5 June Charlotte was in Greenwich.

In London, Charlotte resided at St James's Palace. Here she had made many visits from her family, and as a royal she was also introduced to the authorities. The king made a final goodbye visit from Windsor Castle on 6 October. On Tuesday 9 October Charlotte left England on board Royal Sovereign, but a storm forced her back into Harwich. On the 14th, Royal Sovereign anchored before Klundert on the Hollands Diep. After spending the night on board, Charlotte embarked on the steamboat Stad Nijmegen. On 19 October she arrived in Frankfurt, where she met the king and queen of Württemberg and the Duke of Cambridge. On 24 October she was back at Ludwigsburg Palace.

Charlotte died at Ludwigsburg Palace on 6 October 1828 and is buried in its royal vault.

Honours and arms

Honours
 Royal Family Order of King George IV
 Dame Grand Cross of the Order of Saint Catherine, 5 April 1797

Arms
As a daughter of the sovereign, Charlotte had use of the arms of the kingdom, differenced by a label argent of three points, the centre point bearing a rose gules, the outer points each bearing a cross gules.

Ancestry

References

1766 births
1828 deaths
18th-century British people
19th-century British people
18th-century British women
19th-century British women
British princesses
Princesses Royal
House of Hanover
People from Westminster
Queens consort of Württemberg
Deaths from edema
Hereditary Princesses of Württemberg
Hanoverian princesses
Princesses of Württemberg
Duchesses of Württemberg
Children of George III of the United Kingdom
Daughters of kings